Mario Rodríguez (born 6 October 1988) is a Mexican professional boxer who has held the IBF mini flyweight title from September 2012 until March 2013. He is also the first world boxing champion from the city of Guasave.

Professional career
In July 2011, Rodríguez won a ten round unanimous decision over undefeated Mexican, Manuel Jiménez to win the interim NABF Strawweight Championship.

IBF Strawweight Championship
On 1 September 2012 Rodríguez upset the undefeated Nkosinathi Joyi to capture the IBF strawweight title. This bout was held at the Auditorio Benito Juárez, in Guadalajara, Mexico.

Professional boxing record

See also
List of world mini-flyweight boxing champions
List of Mexican boxing world champions

References

External links

 

|-

1988 births
Living people
Mexican male boxers
Boxers from Sinaloa
People from Guasave
Mini-flyweight boxers
World mini-flyweight boxing champions
International Boxing Federation champions
21st-century Mexican people